The Institute of Pharmacology and Structural Biology (IPBS) is a joint CNRS-Paul Sabatier University research center. It has a scientific and administrative staff of 260 people, including a large number of postdoctoral workers and postgraduate (master's and PhD) students. The primary objective of the institute is the identification and characterization of novel therapeutic targets in the fields of cancer and infectious diseases (tuberculosis).

The institute is located on 205 route de Narbonne and shares the campus with Laboratoire de Chimie de Coordination (LCC).

The IPBS is part of a scientific network of Toulouse's main life science labs.

History
In 1972, Claude Paoletti and Jean Cros create the Laboratory of Basic Pharmacology and Toxicology (French : LPTF), which will become in 1990 the seventh French pole of the National Programme IMABIO (Macromolecules engineering). New topics such as oncology, neurology and genotoxicology emerge.

Between 1990 et 1995, new teams arrive to develop topics about tuberculosis, protein engineering and structural biology.

1996-1999
Professor Jean Cros founds the IPBS in 1996, with the aim of applying the methods and concepts of modern cell, molecular and structural biology to the identification and validation of novel pharmacological targets in the fields of cancer and G-protein-coupled receptors. The opening of a new building in December 1997 makes it possible to bring all the groups of the institute together on the same site, on the campus of the Paul Sabatier University.

1999-2008
Under the leadership of Professor François Amalric, the IPBS pursues the same objectives: the characterization and validation of new pharmacological targets by molecular and cell biology approaches, together with analysis of the structure/function relationships of biomolecules and their assemblies.

The “Cancer Biology” Department was created in 2005, and five new teams were established during the 2005-2009 period. These new teams reinforced the two main axes of research covered by the Department: DNA transactions and repair, and the tumor microenvironment. Finally, the “Structural Biology and Biophysics” Department was created in 2009 with the objective of enhancing the exposure of the IPBS in structural biology and biophysics.

2009-Now
In January 2009, Dr. Jean-Philippe Girard succeeded Prof. François Amalric as Director of the institute. The current policy of the IPBS is to increase its international cooperation through the strengthening of the framework for hosting foreign students and researchers, who currently number 21, and through the participation to mobility programmes such as “Joint Research Programs” developed by the CNRS and “Hubert Curien partnerships” developed by the Ministry of Europe and Foreign Affairs.

Logos

Research fields
The IPBS has seventeen research teams, divided into three departements:
Cancer biology (six teams)
Structural biology and biophysics (five teams)
Tuberculosis and infection biology (six teams)

Core facilities
IPBS supports technological facilities and equipment designed to advance the research efforts of the institute and of external investigators. The institute hosts four technological platforms.

Two main platforms
Proteomics (Head: Dr Odile Burlet‐Schiltz).

Based on its expertise in the field of mass spectrometry and proteomics and using up-to-date mass spectrometry instrumentation and bioinformatics tools, the facility is able to handle programs in various areas from biology and health to agricultural applications.
PICT ("Plateforme Intégrée de Criblage de Toulouse"; Head: Dr Laurent Maveyraud).

The IPBS is partner site for two other platforms
TRI ("Toulouse Réseau Imagerie"; Head: Dr Antonio Peixoto).

The core facility offers the instrumentation and expertize to visualize complex systems from molecules to whole organisms and at a time scale ranging from nanoseconds to several days by the use of time-lapse imaging. Moreover, it possesses the instrumentation and expertize for the phenotypic characterization and sorting of eukaryotic and prokaryotic cells by flow cytometry.
Anexplo (Head: Dr Magali Jacquier).

The IPBS zootechnics facilities are part of the life science core facility of Toulouse which includes eight other sites with complementary technical skills.

These technological facilities are included in a regional network of research platforms in life sciences, open to groups from both public and private sectors and involved in technology development and innovation.

Technological transfer and partnership with industry
Since 1999, IPBS has been very active in partnership with industry. The first public-private high throughput screening centre between CNRS and Pierre Fabre SA was present at IPBS from 1999 to 2003. Eight small biotechnology companies (start-ups) have been started or incubated at the IPBS during the last ten years.
Forty-two patent applications and extensions were filed, and more than eighty research contracts signed with the pharmaceutical industry and biotech companies.
In recognition of all these activities, the IPBS has been granted the "INPI Innovation Trophies 2008" Award.
Industrial partnerships include : Abtech, Artichem, Adisseo France, Aureus Pharma, BetaTech, BT Pharma, Biovector Therapeutics, Bruker, Cayla, Centre d’Immunologie Pierre Fabre, CERPEM, CRIIT Castres, Diverchim, EDF, Endocube, GlaxoSmithKline, Genclis, GTP Technology, Immuno Designed Molecules, Institut Européen de Biologie Cellulaire, Institut de Recherche Pierre Fabre, L-Path (USA), Millegen, Mitsui-Norin, Nanobiotix, Novaleads, Oncodesign, Palumed, Pierre Fabre Dermo Cosmétique, Praxcell, Protein Biosensor, Sanofi-Aventis, SFRI, Techniques et Fabrication Electroniques, Total, Veolia...
Intellectual Property : At present, seventy applications for patent or their extensions involve IPBS researchers as inventors or co-inventors. Two patents licensed.
Legal tools and good practices : Contracts for technical and counselling services, for research collaborations, consortium and confidentiality agreements, consulting, material transfer agreements, laboratory book data, quality control...
Help to emerging start-ups : Since 1999, the IPBS has developed scientific collaborations and/or hosted activities of eight companies: Abtech (struck off on 01/9/2008), Endocube (struck off on 12/3/2008), Millegen (closed), Novaleads (struck off on 10/9/2014), Nanobiotix, Protein Bio Sensor (registered on 06/7/2005), Praxcell (struck off on 05/3/2012), Icelltis (registered on 10/01/2008).

Scientific Advisory Board (SAB)
The Scientific Advisory Board advises the Director and Executive Board simultaneously on the scientific policy of the institute and public relations but also on strategic aspects relating to the life cycle of research teams (creation, modification of research orientations, transition, etc.). Besides, it assesses the scientific projects conducted by each research team at the institute.

It is composed of nine researchers, who are (in alphabetical order):
Frederick Alt from Harvard Medical School,
Mina Bissell from Lawrence Berkeley National Laboratory,
Patrick Couvreur from Institut Galien Paris Sud,
Sabine Ehrt from Weill Cornell Medical College,
Jean-Pierre Gorvel from Centre d'immunologie de Marseille-Luminy,
Kathryn S Lilley from University of Cambridge,
Dino Moras from Institut de Génétique et de Biologie Moléculaire et Cellulaire,
Eric Solary from Institut Gustave Roussy,
David Russell from Cornell University.

International relations
The IPBS has been involved in many research networks under the European Commission’s Frameworks, from the Fifth Framework Programme for Research and Technological Development activities (FP5) to Horizon 2020 projects.

These networks involve several teams from the “Tuberculosis & Infection Biology” department, which are participating in European integrated projects fighting tuberculosis, particularly in some projects coordinated by the "Tuberculosis Vaccine Initiative", but also involve teams from the "Cancer Biology" and "Structural Biology & Biophysics" departments.

Since 2000, the “Tuberculosis & Infection Biology” department of the IPBS is part of the TBVAC Consortium. The latter brings in a large number of key partners from excellent laboratories from Europe, as well as the United States, Asia, Africa and Australia, many of which are global leaders in the field of tuberculosis. Scientists and developers from 40 research partners collaborate in TBVAC2020. The current 4-year project started in January 2015 and is coordinated by the Tuberculosis Vaccine Initiative (TBVI).

Since 2015, IPBS takes part in various European schemes, such as RESPIRE 2 and 3, and in the Initial Training Network (ITN).

Based on a solid and old collaboration with the University of Ljubljana, the IPBS developed a European Associated Laboratory (LEA) entitled “Pulsed Electric Fields Applications in Biology and Medicine”, abbreviated as “LEA EBAM”. This French-Slovenian “without walls” laboratory, created in January 2011 for four years, has been renewed for the same duration.

IPBS teams are also members of the interregional (Spain-France-Andorra) POCTEFA 2014-2020 created to promote the sustainable development of the border territories of the three countries on both sides of the Pyrenees.

The IPBS in numbers
The IPBS is mainly supported by direct and indirect finance from the CNRS and the Paul Sabatier University, covering the wages of more than 260 researchers. Other funding sources include the European Union, the Occitanie (administrative region), industry, public contracts, charities and facilities. The average annual budget is seven million euros.

Today, the institute adds up 2200 publications, fifty European and international contracts, more than 300 theses supported by students, seventy patents registered and eight startups incubated.

See also
French National Center for Scientific Research
Université Toulouse III-Paul Sabatier

References

1996 establishments in France
Science and technology in France
University of Toulouse